Brendan Coleman (born 1976) is an Irish hurling selector and former player who is currently a selector with the Cork under-20 hurling team. During his playing days he lined out for club side Youghal, divisional side Imokilly and at inter-county level with the Cork senior hurling team.

Honours

Youghal
Cork Intermediate Football Championship (1): 2000
Cork Junior Football Championship (1): 1999

Imokilly
Cork Senior Hurling Championship (2): 1997, 1998

Cork
Munster Senior Hurling Championship (1): 2000
All-Ireland Intermediate Hurling Championship (1): 2003
Munster Intermediate Hurling Championship (2): 1999, 2003
All-Ireland Junior Football Championship (1): 2001
Munster Junior Football Championship (1): 2001
All-Ireland Under-21 Hurling Championship (1): 1997
Munster Under-21 Hurling Championship (1): 1997

References

1976 births
Living people
Youghal hurlers
Youghal Gaelic footballers
Imokilly hurlers
Cork inter-county hurlers
Hurling selectors